Rikelmi Valentim dos Santos (born 14 August 2001), simply known as Rikelmi, is a Brazilian footballer who plays as a forward for Belgian club RWDM on loan from Botafogo.

Club career
Born in São Paulo, Rikelmi began his career with Portuguesa's youth setup, and later represented Internacional before making his senior debut with Nacional-SP in the 2018 Copa Paulista. He moved to Juventus-SP in 2019, making two first team appearances in the following year.

In 2020, Rikelmi was loaned to Botafogo until the end of 2021. On 7 December 2021, he was bought outright by the club, signing a contract until December 2024.

Rikelmi made his first team debut for Fogão on 25 January 2022, coming on as a second-half substitute for Juninho in a 1–1 Campeonato Carioca away draw against Boavista. He scored his first goal for the club on 7 March, netting the third in a 5–0 home routing of Volta Redonda.

Rikelmi made his debut in the top tier of Brazilian football on 29 May 2022, replacing Daniel Borges late into a 0–1 away loss against Coritiba.

On 25 August 2022, Rikelmi was loaned to RWDM in Belgium.

Personal life
Rikelmi was named after Juan Román Riquelme.

Career statistics

References

2000 births
Footballers from São Paulo
Living people
Brazilian footballers
Association football forwards
Nacional Atlético Clube (SP) players
Clube Atlético Juventus players
Botafogo de Futebol e Regatas players
RWDM47 players
Campeonato Brasileiro Série A players
Challenger Pro League players
Brazilian expatriate footballers
Expatriate footballers in Belgium
Brazilian expatriate sportspeople in Belgium